Balta spuria is a species of cockroach, indigenous to Australia.

References

Cockroaches
Insects of Australia
Insects described in 1865